Brooke Boney is an Australian journalist and television presenter of Aboriginal Gamilaroi descent.  

Boney is currently news and entertainment presenter of Nine Network's breakfast program Today.

Early life and education 
Boney was born around 1987 in Muswellbrook, New South Wales, the eldest of six children. The family, headed by her mother, were quite poor, but she grew up with a strong work ethic which she attributes to the influence of her grandfather. She is a Gamilaroi woman.

She worked as a volunteer in community radio while at high school, and after finishing school, worked as an advertising cadet at the Australian Financial Review.

After entering as a mature age student, Boney graduated from University of Technology Sydney with a Bachelor of Communication (Journalism) in 2014.

Career 
While studying for her degree, Boney produced the Blackchat program on Sydney's Koori Radio before morning lectures, and did an internship at the Australian Broadcasting Corporation in the afternoons. Before graduating, she was appointed as a political correspondent for NITV, based at Parliament House from 2013. Her first assignments had to cover the March 2013 Australian Labor Party leadership spill and the federal election that followed.

She worked as a newsreader on the ABC's radio network Triple J from 2016 to 2018, and became known for using the traditional Gamilaroi greeting of "Yaama" when introducing herself at the start of Triple J's news bulletin.

In December 2018, it was announced that Boney had been appointed as entertainment reporter on the Nine Network's breakfast program Today, to work alongside the network's long-serving entertainment editor Richard Wilkins in 2019.  she is in this role.

In January 2019, just days into her new job, she was asked for her opinion on Change the Date, a campaign which proposes moving Australia Day from its current date, which marks the date of the arrival of the First Fleet in Sydney. She replied:

This prompted a harsh backlash, mixed reactions from some viewers, and much commentary in the media.

In February 2021, Southern Cross Austereo announced that Boney and Linda Marigliano would host The Dream Club podcast on LiSTNR. The podcast is a weekly social commentary and pop culture reviews on all the highs and lows of internet culture.

In November 2021, Boney won Nine Network's Lego Masters: Bricksmas specials.

In December 2022, Nine announced that Boney will host Carols by Candelight with David Campbell.

In January 2023, Boney replaced Alex Cullen as news presenter on Today taking on news and entertainment with Cullen focusing on sport.

Other roles
Boney is a spokesperson for the GO Foundation, which focuses on education for Indigenous Australians.

A portrait of Boney and her pet pug Jimmy by Laura Jones was a finalist for the 2022 Archibald Prize.

References 

1987 births
Living people
Australian television journalists
Australian women journalists
Gamilaraay
Nine News presenters